ERM or Erm may refer to:

Companies
 ERM (consultancy), a global sustainability consultancy firm

People
 Erm (surname), an Estonian surname

Places
 Erm, Netherlands, a village

Science and medicine
 ERM protein family
 Effects range median
 Emotion-in-relationships model
 Epiretinal membrane
 Epithelial cell rests of Malassez
 Entity–relationship model

Other uses 
 European Exchange Rate Mechanism
 e Reuse Methodology
 Electronic resource management
 Embedding rich media, an HTML/XML element; see HTML element#embed
 Empirical risk minimization
 Employee relationship management
 Enterprise relationship management
 Enterprise release management
 Enterprise report management
 Enterprise risk management
 Environmental resource management
 Estonian National Museum